Miranda Bailey, M.D., F.A.C.S. is a fictional character from the medical drama television series Grey's Anatomy. The character was created by series creator and producer Shonda Rhimes, and has been portrayed by actress Chandra Wilson since the show's inception in 2005. Wilson has reprised her role in the spin-off series Private Practice and Station 19. Having appeared in 387 episodes total (372 on Grey's Anatomy, 2 on Private Practice, and 13 on Station 19), as of October 2021, Bailey is the most appearing character in the Grey's Anatomy franchise.

Introduced as a resident in general surgery at Seattle Grace Hospital, Bailey works her way up to the attending physician level, and is eventually named Chief of Surgery. Her relationship with the five surgical interns she is in charge of - Meredith Grey (Ellen Pompeo), Cristina Yang (Sandra Oh), Izzie Stevens (Katherine Heigl), George O'Malley (T.R. Knight) and Alex Karev (Justin Chambers) - is a focal point at the beginning of the series.

Storyline

Miranda Bailey married Tucker Jones ten years prior to the beginning of Meredith Grey's internship. Her future Chief Richard Webber attended her wedding with his wife, Adele. She is a Wellesley College graduate.

She is introduced to the interns as "The Nazi" in the first season premiere because of her tough personality and blunt attitude. When she was still a resident, Webber once pointed out that she disliked nearly every attending she worked under; the attendings take her seriously due to her formidable reputation as an excellent surgeon. Off the bat, she tells her interns to "not bother sucking up cause I already hate you and that's not going to change"; however, Miranda's more motherly and protective side is exhibited, as she is shown to care about not only her patients but also her colleagues. She is protective of her interns, as shown when she warns Derek to stay away from Meredith. Miranda stays beside Cristina's side as she recovers from surgery. It is later revealed that she has been married to her husband Tucker Jones (Cress Williams) for ten years and that she is pregnant. Her son is born during a bomb scare at Seattle Grace while her husband is being treated in surgery for injuries from a car crash. George O'Malley helped her through labor, and she thanked him by naming her son William George Bailey Jones (though he is nicknamed "Tuck").

Bailey adjusts to becoming a parent and reconciling this with her desire to continue her career as a surgeon.  Her professional confidence was shaken and questioned by other surgeons when Izzie Stevens cut Denny Duquette's LVAD wire and Denny subsequently died. Christina kept Burke's secret about his disabled hand, and Bailey felt that she wasn't in control of her interns and that she was ultimately responsible for these incidents. Dr. Richard Webber, Chief of Surgery, comforts her saying "You raised them like babies, and some of them turn out just like you". Disillusioned by how little she can help patients as a surgeon, Bailey pushes to open a free clinic at Seattle Grace. Izzie helps pay for it from a multi-million dollar bequest from Denny Duquette, whom she had loved. Bailey loses the post of Chief Resident to Callie Torres.

In season 4, Bailey decides to back up Callie Torres in her post of Chief Resident, which the Chief observes. He says that he made a mistake in not choosing Bailey in the first place. Realizing that she cannot balance her responsibilities as chief resident and direct the clinic, Bailey chooses Izzie Stevens for the position in order to have more time for her family and her career. 
Bailey realizes that she has become somewhat bored with General Surgery and may need a change of specialty. She became drawn to Pediatric surgery after working on a number of pediatric cases and working closely with Arizona Robbins, a pediatric surgeon, who convinces her to apply for a pediatric fellowship. Chief Webber, who had taught her general surgery and previously offered her a position as an attending surgeon, is unhappy with Bailey's decision to leave the specialty he trained her for, and discourages her at every opportunity, giving her an uninspiring letter of recommendation and purchasing a surgical robot to lure her back to General Surgery. Ultimately, Bailey decides to continue to pursue her career in general surgery after her husband threatens her with divorce if she accepts the fellowship offer. Bailey accepts the position as an attending general surgeon and divorces her husband for presenting her with the ultimatum, stating she will not have the time to learn a new specialty as a single mother. When Izzie Stevens is diagnosed with cancer that has a 5% survival rate, Bailey supports Stevens through her rounds of chemo and cancer treatments.

In season 6, after declining a fellowship in Pediatrics, Bailey starts as an Attending in General Surgery. She begins a relationship with an anesthesiologist from Mercy West, Ben Warren, who joined the staff after the merger between Seattle Grace and Mercy West. In the final of the season, a gunman enters the hospital, believing that the staff had failed his wife. He shoots several people, including resident Charles Percy. Due to an order to shut down the elevators, Dr. Bailey is unable to get Charles to an operating room to perform the surgery he needs. Charles dies in Miranda's lap. As Miranda comforts him, Charles says, "You [Bailey] were always my favorite, I thought you should know".

Distraught by these experiences, Bailey takes time off to visit her parents with her son. On her return in the first episode of the season 7, she breaks up with Ben. Mary Portman, the patient with whom she bonded with while trying to save Charles, returns for her scheduled surgery, which appears to go well, but she does not wake up, and the cause is never discovered. Miranda starts on a quest to cure fistulas and encounters a nurse, Eli, whom she starts dating.

Bailey is offended when Meredith violates the rules of the Alzheimer's clinical trial in order to help the Chief's wife. She resents Meredith because the Chief resigns as head of surgery due to this. Bailey resumes control of Ellis Grey's Diabetes trial, and Webber pushes her to forgive Meredith and choose her as staff for the trial. She breaks off her relationship with Eli, not wanting to pursue it further, and renews her relationships with Ben the anesthesiologist. She eventually moves in with him, but he gains a surgical internship in California.

They become engaged nonetheless, and new interns at Seattle Grace-Mercy West refer to her as BCB ("Booty Call Bailey"): whenever Ben is in town she is giddy and has sex with him as much as possible. On the way to her wedding, Bailey is pulled in to perform surgery on Richard's wife, Adele. After saving Adele, she returns to the venue and marries Ben. She launches a genome mapping program, and Meredith is the first one to test it. 

In season 9, an investigation takes place on Bailey after three of her patients contracted an infection and died. It concludes that Bailey was an asymptomatic carrier of the MRSA bacteria and transmitted the infection via a new brand of gloves that the hospital had used that were shown to be permeable. Despite being cleared of wrongdoing, after the investigation, Bailey shuts everyone out for some time, because feeling that she is dirty and contaminated. She blamed Dr. Webber the most for abandoning her and avoids him altogether. Eventually, her husband, Ben, flies to Seattle to get her out of the genome lab. Ben says that he has dropped out of residency to spend more time with her and Tuck. Bailey is not impressed by this decision and starts exhibiting some odd behaviors, later she is diagnosed with OCD after what happened with the CDC investigation. Though initially resistant to see a therapist and take medication, Bailey is able to resume her surgical career.

In season 12, Bailey is promoted to Chief of Surgery. She gets very upset when Ben shows interest as a firefighter, after the finale of season 13 when Dr. Edwards sets fire in Grey Sloan Memorial to defend herself from the rapist. Later that season, Miranda Bailey gets hospitalized due to a heart attack.

In Season 15, Bailey takes a stress sabbatical and has Alex Karev become interim chief of surgery. She returns to her job several months later.

In Season 16, Bailey fires Meredith after she commits insurance fraud to save one of her patients. Shortly after, she is told by Maggie that she is both pregnant with her second child and perimenopausal. In the fall finale of Season 16, Bailey suffers a miscarriage. Bailey also fosters a teenage boy, Joey Phillips. 

In Season 17, as Grey-Sloan treats patients for COVID-19, Bailey feels guilty as she has just moved her parents into a local nursing home. Her guilt magnifies after her mother is hospitalized with the virus. Bailey sings to her mother as she succumbs to the disease, and decides to go back to work shortly after, resisting attempts by Richard and Jackson to convince her to take personal time.

In Season 18, while the hospital is undergoing investigations due to the failing residency class, Bailey quits and gives her Chief of Surgery position to Meredith.

In Season 19, Bailey returns as an attending general surgeon.

Development

Casting and creation 
Shonda Rhimes wrote the character of Bailey to be a petite blonde-haired white woman with curls as "it would be unexpected to have this sweet-looking person open her mouth and say tough things." However, Wilson's audition went so well that she was offered the part, and the character was rewritten. Sandra Oh was originally going to audition for the part of Dr. Bailey. Of her role, Wilson said: "I thought it was endearing; endearing as the word 'Nazi' can be." Wilson explained how she plays Bailey:

Characterization 

Bailey has been characterized as "straightforward", "tough", and "quick-witted" by Grey's Anatomy executives. Reflecting on her character, Chandra Wilson said: "I think a strength and a weakness for her is her ego. The strength part is great because it really does make her a really good physician. She's really good at her job and she continues to evolve and she continues to look at ways to be 'value added' at the hospital and is incredibly independent. That independence has certainly gotten in the way of her personal relationships. It's gotten in the way of her being a team player on many occasions."

Reception

USA Today TV critic wrote in 2006 that Emmy voters could consider Chandra Wilson because she adds "warmth and humor to Bailey without making her go all squishy." Reviewing the show's fourth season, Patrick Luce of Monsters and Critics found Bailey "one of the most interesting characters to watch" as "she had to deal with losing a promotion to Sara Ramírez’s Dr. Torres; her own marriage trouble; and the continued stress of balancing being a mom and being a doctor." He also appreciated the fact that people got to see "a softer side" of her while she kept "all the biting satire and sarcasm that made the character great." Shawna Malcom of the Los Angeles Times deemed Bailey and Sam her favorite pairing of the Grey's Anatomy and Private Practice crossover, praising: "The grief he gave her about becoming a pediatric surgeon … the grief she gave him for letting ex-wife Naomi go and wind up in the arms of Archer … the fist bump. I say again, the fist bump! Together, Chandra Wilson and Taye Diggs are hilarious and touching and all sorts of fabulous. Here’s hoping this isn’t the last we ever see of this unexpectedly dynamic duo."  Fellow Los Angeles Times critic, Carina MacKenzie, welcomed Bailey's "flirtation" with Ben (Jason George) because it was "nice to see her fun, flirty side" presented with a bit of humor after the deterioration of her relationship with Tucker. Margaret Lyons of New York Magazine was happy with the evolution of Bailey and Torres' friendship in the first half of the ninth season, calling it "the one bright spot": "They joke, they tease each other, they offer sage love advice to one another, now that they're both on their second marriages." Entertainment Weekly included Bailey in its list of the "30 Great TV Doctors and Nurses". AOL TV named her one of the 100 Most Memorable Female TV Characters.

Chandra Wilson has received multiple nominations for her portrayal of Dr. Miranda Bailey. She won a 2007 Screen Actors Guild Award for her performance in the show's third season. She has been nominated each year from 2006 to 2009 at the Emmy Awards for "Supporting Actress in a Drama Series", losing in 2007 to co-star Katherine Heigl in the role of Izzie Stevens for the performance in the episode "Oh, the Guilt". She has also been praised for her performance in Grey's Anatomy at the Screen Actors Guild Awards, receiving three nominations along with the other cast members for "Outstanding Performance by an Ensemble in a Drama Series" each year from 2006 to 2008, with the 2007 Awards marking a victory.

References
Specific

General

External links 
Grey's Anatomy at ABC.com

Grey's Anatomy characters
Fictional surgeons
Fictional African-American people
Television characters introduced in 2005
Fictional female doctors
Crossover characters in television
American female characters in television

pt:Anexo:Lista de personagens de Grey's Anatomy#Miranda Bailey